The Jamil Hussein controversy was an instance where conservative blogger Michelle Malkin questioned an Associated Press source.

In an Associated Press (AP) article dated November 25, 2006, it was reported that "rampaging militiamen burned and blew up four mosques" in the Hurriya neighborhood of Baghdad and that six Sunnis had been dragged out of prayers and burned alive. The AP report was attributed to "Jamil Hussein", identified as a captain in the Iraqi police. In the words of The Washington Post, the attacks "... illustrated Iraqi security forces' inability to rein in violence, at a time when U.S. leaders want them to take greater responsibility for the country's security, a vital benchmark for any strategy to withdraw U.S. troops."

Following up on the report, the Multinational Force Iraq claimed that an Iraqi Army patrol investigating the area found only one mosque had been burned and that the patrol had been unable to confirm media reports that six Sunni civilians had been burned to death."

When Jamil Hussein was called upon to substantiate his claims, the Interior Ministry initially denied that he was a member of the Multinational Force Iraq.  Attempts to locate and identify Hussein failed, and it was later suggested by conservative bloggers, including Michelle Malkin, that he did not exist. In January 2007, the Interior Ministry recognized Hussein as an active member of the Multinational Force Iraq.

Malkin has issued a correction for her denial of Hussein's existence but contests AP claims of destroyed mosques and civilians burned alive. Malkin visited Iraq and verified that only one mosque had suffered significant damage. She further stated that the AP's only corroborating witness had recanted and that no one since has found any evidence of the claim about people being burned alive.

Background

An Associated Press (AP) report published November 25, 2006 by Fox News and other media outlets, reported, in part, that on November 24, 2006:

A story in the Washington Post, published on November 25, 2006, seemed to confirm the reports that multiple mosques had been attacked on the 24th.

An Iraqi army patrol of the area on November 25, 2006, discovered, however, that 

... only one mosque had been burned in the neighborhood ... (t)he patrol was also unable to confirm media reports that six Sunni civilians were allegedly dragged out of Friday prayers and burned to death.  Neither Baghdad police nor Coalition forces have reports of any such incident.

There were inconsistencies between different AP versions of the story. In one version, the dead were taken to the morgue at Al-Yarmouk hospital. In a later version of the story, the six victims were taken away by residents and buried in a nearby cemetery.

On January 21, 2007, Malkin reported in an opinion article in the New York Post that she had visited two of the six mosques on a trip she had taken to Iraq. At her online HotAir magazine, Malkin posted video taken during her trip to one of the mosques showing a substantially destroyed dome. She reported that this mosque had also been hit with small-arms fire and two of its inside rooms were burned out by a firebomb. Her published photographs and video supported the assertions of the Multi-National Force that the damage reported by Jamil Hussein was exaggerated.

AP source identity

The AP initially identified Jamil Hussein as a police captain with an office at the Yarmouk police station in western Baghdad. The AP later identified their source as Jamal Gholaiem Hussein of the al-Khadra district.

The AP issued a statement to Editor & Publisher reporting that Ministry spokesman Abdul-Karim Khalaf, who had previously denied Hussein's existence, had formally acknowledged that Hussein was an officer assigned to the Khadra police station. The Ministry also released information about the pending arrest and disciplinary action against Hussein for "breaking police regulations against talking to reporters."

Associated Press reaction

Associated Press reporters returned and found "more witnesses who described the attack in particular detail"; these new witnesses were all anonymous, AP stating that they feared persecution if identified. AP reported that Captain Jamil Hussein was a genuine police contact and argue that the Interior Ministry's files are inaccurate.

The Associated Press, which has lost four employees to violence in Iraq so far, has questioned bloggers attacking their credibility. AP Executive Editor Kathleen Carroll has said: 

Carroll suggested that critics might be more concerned that Hussein could face imprisonment for being a source to journalists. "I think a little perspective is warranted here," she said. "While this has been going on, hundreds if not thousands of Iraqi civilians have been killed and hundreds of [servicemen] have died."

References

External links
"So Just Who Is Capt. Jamil Hussein?", The Lede, The New York Times, 30 November 2006.
"Separating Hyperbole From Horror in Iraq ". The New York Times, 4 December 2006.
"AP's Iraqi Source Is Real: Now What Do Conservative Bloggers Say?" at Editor and Publisher, 5 January 2007
"Spherics", On The Media,  National Public Radio, 12 January 2007

2006 controversies
Associated Press
Criticism of journalism
Political controversies in the United States
2006 in Iraq